Penkin (from пенка, meaning foam) is a Russian masculine surname, its feminine counterpart is Penkina. Notable people with the surname include:

Kevin Penkin (born 1992), British-Australian composer
Svetlana Penkina (1951–2016), Soviet actress

Russian-language surnames